The Information Commissioner of Canada is an independent ombudsman and an officer of parliament of Canada who reports directly to the House of Commons of Canada and the Senate of Canada.

The commissioner's work is supported by the Office of the Information Commissioner, which was established in 1983 under the Access to Information Act (ATIA) – Canada's freedom of information legislation. The office assists individuals and organizations who believe that federal institutions have not respected their rights under the ATIA.  More specifically, the Office of the Information Commissioner:

 carries out investigations and dispute-resolution efforts to resolve complaints
 monitors federal institutions’ performances under the ATIA
 represents the commissioner in court cases, and provides legal advice on investigations and legislative matters

The information commissioner provides arms-length oversight of the federal government's access to information practices. The commissioner encourages and assists federal institutions to adopt approaches to information-sharing that meet the objectives of the ATIA, and advocates for greater access to information in Canada.

Whenever possible, the commissioner relies on persuasion to solve disputes, asking for a federal court review only if an individual has been improperly denied access and a negotiated solution has proved impossible.

Caroline Maynard is the current information commissioner, appointed, for a seven-year term,  on March 1, 2018.

Information commissioners of Canada 
There have been six information commissioners since the office was established in 1983. They hold office for seven-year terms (Access to Information Act, s. 54).

Caroline Maynard (March 2018 – present)
Suzanne Legault (2010 – February 2018)
Suzanne Legault (2009-2010 – acting)
Robert Marleau (2007-2009 – retired)
John Mercer Reid (1998 – 2006)
John W. Grace (1990 – 1998)
Inger Hansen (1983 – 1990)

See also
Coordination of Access to Information Requests System

References

External links
 Office of the Information Commissioner of Canada
 Decisions database

Federal departments and agencies of Canada
Government agencies established in 1983
Commissioner
Officers of the Parliament of Canada
Information Commissioner
Canada, Information Commissioner